The Biggest Loser Australia: Transformed, the eleventh and final season of the Australian version of the original NBC reality television series The Biggest Loser, premiered on 14 March 2017. The live series finale was held on Monday 1 May 2017 at 11 am during the airing of Studio 10.

The season had very low viewership, routinely being beaten not only by rival commercial networks in the ratings, but also rating behind public broadcasters ABC and SBS. After its second week on air, the show was dropped from airing on Sundays nights, continuing only through Monday-Thursday in its third week on air. With continued falling ratings, the program was pulled from prime time and moved to a daytime slot at 1:00 pm (where re-runs previously aired) from 3 April. The live finale aired at 11am on 1 May 2017 and was watched by 92,000 viewers.

Game variations
Teams: Due to having two trainers this season, the teams will be split into two teams of eight
Mind Sessions: Each week, the contestants will have "Mind Sessions" with weight management psychologist Glenn Mackintosh where they will discuss their mental and physical wellbeing, including analysing the body image baggage they are carrying around and how it can add up on the scales
Voting: For the first time, viewers will get to vote during the Live Grand Final
Winners: There will be two winners. One winner will be based on weight loss (like prior seasons) and will win $50,000. The other will be decided by the viewers who will choose the contestant who has transformed their life the most and that winner will win $100,000.

Contestants
There is slated to be two teams of eight, totaling up to 16 contestants. In week six, the top eight were merged into one team and began to compete as individuals. They were given new black shirts to signify this.
 
{| class="wikitable plainrowheaders" style="text-align:center; line-height:16px; width:99%;"
! Contestants
! Age
! Occupation 
! Team
! Singles 
! Status
|-
| Brett
| 40
| Stonemason & Tradesman
| style="background:blue; color:white;"| Blue Team
| rowspan="8" style="background:black; color:white;"| Black Player 
|  The Biggest Loser ($50,000)
|-
| Lisa-Faye
| 45
| Catering Manager
| style="background:orange; color:black;"| Orange Team
| Finalist
|-
| Lynton
| 27
| Flight instructor
| style="background:blue; color:white;"| Blue Team
| Most Transformed - Australia's Vote Winner ($100,000)
|-
| Nikki
| 25
| Full-time Mum
| style="background:orange; color:black;"| Orange Team
| Finalist
|-
| Sophia
| 33
| Hospitality Waitress
| style="background:orange; color:black;"| Orange Team
| Finalist Originally Eliminated (Week 3), Returned (Week 5) 
|-
| Simon
| 34
| Sales & Marketing Manager
| style="background:orange; color:black;"| Orange Team
| Finalist
|-
| Simmo
| 30
| Sales Manager
| style="background:blue; color:white;"| Blue Team
| style="background:tomato; color:black;"| Eliminated (Week 7)
|-
| Josh
| 35
| Excavator
| style="background:orange; color:black;"| Orange Team
| style="background:tomato; color:black;"| {{nowrap|Eliminated (Week 6),Originally Eliminated (Week 4), Returned (Week 5) }}
|-
| Amy
| 27
| Business Management Advisor
| style="background:blue; color:white;"| Blue Team
| rowspan="8" style="background:white; color:black;"| None
| style="background:tomato; color:black;"| Eliminated (Week 6)
|-
| Matt
| 38
| Marketing Manager
| style="background:blue; color:white;"| Blue Team
| style="background:tomato; color:black;"| Eliminated (Week 5)
|-
| Luke
| 35
| Sales Manager
| style="background:orange; color:black;"| Orange Team
| style="background:tomato; color:black;"| Eliminated (Week 4)
|-
| Jake
| 38
| IT Manager & Former Model
| style="background:orange; color:black;"| Orange Team
| style="background:tomato; color:black;"| Eliminated (Week 3)
|-
|Steph
| 36
| Teacher
| style="background:orange; color:black;"| Orange Team
| rowspan="2" style="background:tomato; color:black;"| Eliminated (Week 2)
|-
| Anna
| 40
| Apprentice Butcher
| style="background:blue; color:white;"| Blue Team
|- 
| Sarah
| 32
| Student Nurse
| style="background:blue; color:white;"| Blue Team
| rowspan="2" style="background:tomato; color:black;"| Eliminated (Week 1)
|-
| Jenny
| 60
| Intensive Care Paramedic
| style="background:blue; color:white;"| Blue Team
|}

Weigh-Ins

In week six, Simon had a 1 kg advantage, which resulted in Josh landing in the bottom 5.
While the eliminated contestants final weights weren't revealed at Finale, in the 'at home' packages during the penultimate episode it was revealed that Sarah had lost 20 kg, Anna was now 71.2 kg, and Josh was now 97 kg.

Weight Loss History

Percentage Loss History

Combined Weightloss & Percentage

In week 2, The Blue Team received a 2 kg advantage in a challenge
In week 3, The Blue Team received a 1 kg advantage in a challenge
In week 4, The Orange Team received a 1 kg advantage in a challenge

The Power
A bracelet given to a challenge winning contestant, team, or the biggest loser for the week. The bracelet holds different powers each week.

Week 1: Immunity - Given to the orange team in the first challenge. All team members had to decide who on their team would receive it. It was given to Nikki.

Week 2: Exclusion of Opposite Team Member - Given to Simmo for being the biggest loser of week 1. He had the power to exclude a member of the orange team from either the team challenge or weigh in. He chose for Josh to sit out of the weigh in, meaning his weight wouldn't count towards the orange team's total.

Week 3: Two Votes - Given to Josh for being the biggest loser of week 2. The power was that if the orange team lost the team challenge and faced elimination, Josh would have two votes. Orange team was sent to elimination and his vote, for Luke, was counted as two votes.

Week 4: Choice of Immunity - Given to Simmo for being the biggest loser of week 3. He had the power to grant someone immunity, anyone, except for himself. He could use it at any point this week and he gave it to Nikki after the elimination challenge.

Week 5: Advantage in Cooking Challenge - Given to Simmo for being the biggest loser of week 4, he has the power to decide who will cook twice for the orange team, he chose Nikki & Simon.

Week 6: Advantage in Running Challenge - Given to Simon for being the biggest loser of week 5. The contestants did a running challenge where at the end of each kilometre they put back on the weight they lost. Simon's power meant that he only had to do 900m for every 1 km the others were doing.

Elimination Results
Description
Week 1: Jenny - Vote (5-1) - Due to losing the elimination challenge, the blue team was sent to elimination and had to vote for a contestant to leave, Jenny was voted for 5 times with herself voting for Amy, this was enough votes for Jenny to be eliminated, Brett and Lynton's vote were not revealed.

Week 1: Sarah - Elimination Arena - Different from previous seasons, the bottom 3 contestants were sent to the elimination arena where the lowest scoring of the 3 was eliminated. Amy, Matt & Sarah were bottom 3 in Weigh In, they had to face off in 2 rounds, first they had to ride elliptical bike up to 3 km in the fastest time, Matt was the fastest and was safe. In the second round, Amy & Sarah had to ride the same elliptical bike but had to keep above 50RPM, first to drop below was eliminated, meaning Sarah was the first under 50RPM and was eliminated.

Week 2: Anna - Vote (3-1-1-1) - Due to losing the elimination challenge, the blue team was sent to elimination and had to vote for a contestant to leave, Anna was voted for 3 times with herself voting for Brett, she was the only one to receive more than 1 vote meaning she was eliminated, with the other 2 votes each individually going to Amy & Matt

Week 2: Steph - Elimination Arena - Simon, Sophia & Steph were bottom 3 in Weigh In, they had to face off in 2 rounds, first round each had to stand in the centre of six FitLite trainers, they light up in a certain sequence, each contestant had to race over and hit each one to make the next light up over 50 times, Simon was the first one to get through the 50 light sequence and was made safe from elimination. Second round was in two stages; the first stage was a balance beam, with more of the FitLites placed to the side of it. Stop along the way, deactivate the lights with your feet. If you fall off the beam you go back to the start, the second stage was to climb a knotted rope and deactivate another light at the top. Both Sophia & Steph passed the balance beam but neither could climb the rope so it went into sudden death. Sudden Death involved both of the girls placing their feet on the lowest knot of the rope and hang on with first one to fall off being eliminated, Steph was first to fall and was eliminated.

Week 3: Sophia - Votes (3-2-1-1-1) - Due to losing the elimination challenge, the orange team was sent to elimination and had to vote for a contestant to leave, Sophia was voted for 3 times with herself voting for Josh, she received the most votes meaning she was eliminated, Josh's vote counted for two times as he had The Power meaning his vote, for Luke, was counted as 2 votes, the other two votes each individually went to Nikki & Simon

Week 3: Jake - Elimination Arena - Jake, Josh & Nikki were bottom 3 in Weigh In, they had to face off in 2 rounds, first round balance on a hemisphere ball with a small ball balanced on a paddle. If the ball falls off or you fall off the ball, they lose the round, Jake & Nikki were the first two to fall off making Josh safe. In the second round, stand on your toes on a small ledge. First to give up is out of the challenge and out of the competition. Jake was the first to fall off meaning he was eliminated.

Week 4: Josh  - Votes (4-1) - Due to losing the elimination challenge, the orange team was sent to elimination and had to vote for a contestant to leave, Josh was voted for 4 times with himself voting for Luke, he received the most votes meaning he was eliminated, Simon's vote was revealed although it wouldn't've affected the outcome.

Week 4: Luke - Elimination Arena - Lisa-Faye, Simon & Luke were bottom 3 in Weigh In, they had to face off in 2 rounds, first round Ride 1 km on an Assalult Bike, Transfer a 40 kg medicine ball from one side to another while trying to balance on blocks and then attempt to keep shooting them until they land them in 
their frame above them and repeat the process until they have landed all four medicine balls. If they fall off the blocks or drop the ball they must go back to the start, Simon was the first to successfully land all four of his medicine balls making him safe. In the second round, hold the medicine ball above your head. First to drop their ball below their head is out of the challenge and out of the competition. Luke was the first to drop his ball below his head meaning he was eliminated.

Week 5: Josh & Sophia - Salvation Arena - Josh, Anna, Luke, Jake & Sophia were top 5 in Weigh In, they had to face off in 2 rounds Transfer weights from the either middle pole or theirs to their opposition pole while attempting to stay on a balance beam and while trying to keep the weight of their own pole. If they fall off the balance beam or drop the weight they must go back to the start. If their pole runs out of room they lose the round, Anna, Jake, Luke and Sophia were the first to get their poles full meaning Josh Returned. In the second round, hold the dumb bell above your barrier. First three to drop their dumb bell below their barrier is out of the challenge and out of the competition, Josh and Luke were the first two out but after 90 minutes the contest was stepped up a level, Anna and Sophia had to keep their arms extended the whole time and could no longer move their hand around the dump bell, Anna was the last one out meaning Sophia Returned.

Results

Challenges
Summary

Week 1

Episode 1: Kayak Race - Each team had to  start at the pier of Q Station, then race down to the beach to retrieve 8 paddles for their kayak (one per team member) with 4 buried in the sand and 4 tied to a buoy in the water.  Then the teams had to split into 4 sets of two (except one as they were sick) then had to race 3.5 km across Sydney Heads from North to South, the first team that had all 4 kayaks cross the finish line first won the challenge and received The Power as reward.

Episode 2: Healthy Cooking - Each team had to choose 2 team members from their team to cook a healthy version of fried chicken, chips and coleslaw, Orange Team chose Lisa & Nikki and Blue Team chose Anna & Matt, they had 60 minutes to do so, they had an open pantry to use. The meals were judged by chef Tobie Puttock, who announced Anna & Matt as the winners meaning the Blue Team won and received advantage for the next challenge, which was revealed in the next challenge as a 10 kg advantage.

Episode 3: Elimination Challenge - Each team member had to each choose an amount of weight to each lift on their shoulders to hold for 30 minutes, the team with the most combined amount left after the 30 minutes won the challenge, the Orange Team was the team left with the most weight meaning they won keeping them safe from the challenge elimination.

Week 2

Episode 5: Healthy Wagon Wheel - Each team had to make a replica of Sarah Wilson's sugar-free gut loving wheelies, a homage to Wagon Wheel, in a relay challenge, each team member had 15 minutes each to make a part, totalling 1hr & 45 minutes. Sarah was the judge and announced the Orange Team and received exclusive use of the house gym for a week as reward.

Episode 6: Elimination Challenge - Three members of each team were tethered to a chain, they had to duck and weave under each other to untangle the chains and release a pole. Once the pole is released a stack of weights can be shifted, one at a time, to the pontoon on the water. All the weights must be on the pontoon before you can move on. Once all the weight is aboard six team members will wade out to lift and carry the pontoon back to shore. The Orange Team was the first team to finish, making them safe from the elimination.

Episode 7: Relay Challenge - The challenge will be over four rounds, each round competitors will be eliminated until the deciding round. The first round is box jumps! Matt of the blue team comes last and is eliminated.
Next round, a minute's worth of shoulder dropping. Pick up a medicine ball onto their shoulder and drop it back down. Jake and Luke of the orange team are the least and are eliminated. Next round is Planks, first three to drop out of the position won't go to round four.
Amy, Lynton and Simmo are first to drop out and are eliminated leaving Brett to fight it out against Steph, Sophia and Simon in the final round. The final round is squats, the last person standing is the winner, which was Brett makin blue team the winners.

Week 3

Episode 9: $25 meal challenge - The challenge involved 2 members from each team preparing a healthy meal that can feed a family of five for $25. Lisa-faye & Jake (Orange Team) volunteer and Amy & Brett (Blue Team) volunteer and cooked Chicken with Roasted Vegetables and a Salad. Hayden Quinn'' (of MasterChef Australia) is the judge of the meals and reveals that the Blue Team's meal was the best of the two declaring them the winners, winning an advantage in the next challenge.

Episode 10: Obstacle Course - The challenge involved picking a member of the team to saw through a log. Then pairs will carry two smaller logs through a number of other obstacles. A mud pit, over a dirt mound, over a series of hurdles, across a river and then through a tire course. Once you've cleared the final obstacle you have to put your log upright at the end of the course. When both logs are in position one person runs a bag through the course again, the bag has their team banner inside and they have to display it at the end on the logs. Last to do so will face elimination. As the Orange Team had 2 more members than the Blue Team, The Blue Team had the advantage to keep out one of the Orange's members, they chose Simon, the other was by default as Josh had an injury and had to sit out. The Blue Team were the victors in the challenge and were safe from elimination.

Episode 11: Head-to-Head Challenge - Tie challenge was a Head-to-head competition over five rounds, first to win three rounds gets wins the challenge, they can't use the same person each round, each team will have to pick which person will go in each time. First round was a rope climb, first to scale the rope three times and ring the bell three times will win the round for their team, Jake (orange) & Simmo (blue) competed, Jake was first to finish and won the round. Second round was rowing, first to row 500m won the round, Lisa-Faye (orange) & Lynton (blue) competed, Lynton was first to finish winning the round. Round three was tug-o-war, first to pull the rope across the line won the round, Luke (orange) & Brett (blue) competed, Brett pulled the rope across the line first and won the round. Round four was a barbell raise beep test where they had to lift the bar 5 times in 30 seconds, then 6 times in 30 seconds. It keeps increasing up to 15 in 30 seconds, meaning a lift per 2 seconds, Simon (orange) & Amy (blue) competed, Amy was first to finish and won the round, meaning that blue had won three rounds giving them the challenge win and a 1 kg advantage for weigh in.

Episodes

Ratings data is from OzTAM and represents the live and same day average viewership from the 5 largest Australian metropolitan centres (Sydney, Melbourne, Brisbane, Perth and Adelaide).

References

External links
 

Australia
2017 Australian television seasons
2017 Australian television series endings